Gunnar Þorvarðarson (born 11 June 1951) is an Icelandic former basketball player and coach and a former member of the Icelandic national basketball team. As a player and coach, he was a member of six national championships with Njarðvík.

Career
Gunnar spent his entire playing career with ÍKF/Njarðvík. In 1983, he became a player-coach for Njarðvík and led the team to three straight national championships. In 1986, he was hired as the head coach of Keflavík. In 1990, Gunnar signed a 2-year contract to coach Grindavík.

In 2005, Gunnar returned to the sidelines as an assistant coach to Einar Árni Jóhannsson with the Njarðvík's team that went on to win the 2006 national championship.

National team career
From 1974 to 1981, Gunnar played 69 games for the Icelandic national basketball team.

Personal life
Gunnar is the father of former Icelandic national team player Logi Gunnarsson.

References

External links
Úrvalsdeild statistics 1978-1985 at kki.is

1951 births
Living people
Gunnar Þorvarðarson
Gunnar Þorvarðarson
Gunnar Þorvarðarson
Gunnar Þorvarðarson
Gunnar Þorvarðarson
Gunnar Þorvarðarson
Gunnar Þorvarðarson
Gunnar Þorvarðarson